The Literary Encyclopedia is an online reference work first published in October 2000.  It was founded as an innovative project designed to bring the benefits of information technology to what at the time was still a largely conservative literary field. From its inception it was developed as a not-for-profit publication aimed to ensure that those who contribute to it are properly rewarded for the time and knowledge they invest - as such, its authors and editors are also shareholders in the Company.

The Literary Encyclopedia offers both freely available content and content and services for subscribers (individual and institutional, consisting mainly of higher education institutions and higher level secondary schools). Articles are solicited by invitation from specialist scholars, then refereed and approved by subject editors, which makes the LE both authoritative and reliable. It contains general profiles of literary writers, but also of major cultural, historical and scientific figures; articles on individual works of literature from all over the world (often containing succinct critical commentary and sections on critical reception); entries on hundreds of literary terms, concepts and movements, as well as extended essays on topics of historical and cultural importance.

The Literary Encyclopedia offers free access, upon request, to its entire database to all educational institutions in countries where the GDP is below the world average. It also offers a number of research grants to young and emerging scholars in its subscribing institutions, funded by royalties donated by the publication's contributors and editors.

The encyclopedia's founding editors were Robert Clark (University of East Anglia), Emory Elliott (University of California at Riverside) and Janet Todd (University of Cambridge), and its current editorial board numbers over 100 distinguished scholars from higher education institutions all over the world.

Written and owned by a global network of scholars and researchers, The Literary Encyclopedia is an ongoing project. So far, it has published over 8000 articles in 16.8 million words, on a wide range of authors, works and topics in world literature, from the classical to the postcolonial. It continues to publish an average of 20-40 new articles every month, and subscribers benefit from considerable cross-referencing possibilities to its articles under the form of lists of recommended critical bibliographies, course-specific bookshelves, and clusters of related articles.

See also
List of online encyclopedias

Notes

External links
 

Online encyclopedias
Encyclopedias of literature
2000 establishments